Are We OK? is a 2013 Turkish drama film directed by Çağan Irmak.

Cast 
 Deniz Celiloğlu - Temmuz
 Aras Bulut İynemli - İhsan
 Sumru Yavrucuk - Temmuz's mother
  - Feride
 Aslı Enver - Beste
 Uğur Güneş (actor) - Serhat
 Gürkan Uygun - İhsan's father

References

External links 

2013 drama films
2013 films
Turkish drama films